The Razzie Award for Worst Musical Score was an award presented at the annual Golden Raspberry Awards for the worst score composed for a film in the previous year. The following is a list of recipients and nominees of that award, along with the film for which they were nominated. The category was discontinued in 1985.

1980s
1981: The Legend of the Lone Ranger - music by John Barry
Heaven's Gate - music by David Mansfield
Thief - music by Tangerine Dream
Under the Rainbow - music by Joe Renzetti
Zorro, The Gay Blade - music by Ian Fraser
1982: The Pirate Movie - music by Kit Hain
Butterfly - music by Ennio Morricone
Death Wish II - music by Jimmy Page
Monsignor - music by John Williams
The Thing - music by Ennio Morricone
1983: The Lonely Lady - music by Charles Calello with Jeff Harrington, J. Pennig and Roger Voudouris
Querelle - music by Peer Raben
Superman III - score adapted and conducted by Giorgio Moroder
Yentl - music by Michel Legrand, lyrics by Alan Bergman and Marilyn Bergman
Yor, the Hunter from the Future - music by John Scott and Guido De Angelis and Maurizio De Angelis
1984: Bolero - music by Peter Bernstein, love scenes scored by Elmer Bernstein
Metropolis (re-edited version) and Thief of Hearts - music by Giorgio Moroder
Rhinestone - original music and lyrics by Dolly Parton, music adapted and conducted by Mike Post
Sheena - music by Richard Hartley
Where the Boys Are '84 - original music by Sylvester Levay
1985: Rocky IV - music composed by Vince DiCola
Fever Pitch - music by Thomas Dolby
King Solomon's Mines - music by Jerry Goldsmith
Revolution - music by John Corigliano
Turk 182 - music by Paul Zaza

Notes

External links
 Official Razzie website

References

Golden Raspberry Awards by category
Film music awards
Awards established in 1982
Awards disestablished in 1985